Richard Sylvannus Reynolds (20 June 1915 – 2 September 2002) was an Australian rules footballer who played for the Essendon Football Club in the Victorian Football League (VFL).

Reynolds is one of four footballers to have won three Brownlow Medals, with the others being Haydn Bunton Sr., Bob Skilton and Ian Stewart. Revered by Essendon supporters, he was often referred to simply as "King Richard".

Family
The son of William Meader Reynolds (1886—1940) and Mary James Reynolds, née Thompson (1885—1941), and one of seven children, Richard Sylvannus Reynolds was born on 20 June 1915. He died on 2 September 2002. He was the brother of Tom Reynolds, the cousin of Richmond champion player and coach Max Oppy, and the grandfather of Joel Reynolds.

Early life and career

Reynolds grew up supporting  and sold lollies outside Princes Park on match days.

When Reynolds won his first Brownlow Medal in 1934,  champion Haydn Bunton Sr., whom Reynolds had narrowly beaten to win the award, was the first person to telegraph his congratulations, a sporting gesture that Reynolds deeply appreciated.

In June 1947, it was announced that Reynolds would start writing about football for the now-defunct Melbourne newspaper The Argus.

Like many footballers, Reynolds was also a noted cricketer. He was a successful medium-fast bowler for Essendon Cricket Club but gave up the game when it started to interfere with football. In January 1949, he made a return to district cricket when Essendon batsman Ken Meuleman was picked for State duty.

After being re-elected yet again as player-coach by the Essendon committee in February 1949, Reynolds guided the Bombers to the Grand Final against , which they won by 73 points. Reynolds, who was playing his 299th game, described it afterwards as "the best Essendon performance he could remember."

Off the field, Reynolds was a shy and private man, noted for his humility about his footballing achievements.

Champions of Essendon 
In 2002, an Essendon panel ranked him first in their Champions of Essendon list of the 25 greatest players ever to have played for Essendon.

Just three days before his death, after being given a standing ovation by the crowd at the announcement dinner, at which he was named the greatest Essendon player of all time, Reynolds was visibly moved and stated: "I don't deserve this honour... Bill Hutchison was the best player I ever saw."

Death
Reynolds' funeral was held at St Paul's Cathedral, Melbourne, on 6 September 2002. After the service, the hearse made its way to Windy Hill, where Essendon fans had gathered to farewell their greatest player one last time.

His family's link with Essendon continued when his grandson Joel Reynolds was selected by the club in the 2001 AFL Draft. He made his debut in Round 3, 2002, against Brisbane at the Gabba, with Dick watching from the stands.

A statue in his honour was erected in 2004 at the Parade of Champions at the Melbourne Cricket Ground.

Brownlow Medals
In July 2017, it was announced by Reynolds' family that his three Brownlow Medals were to be auctioned by Mosgreen.

References

Bibliography

External links

 
 AFL Hall of Fame Legends
 
 Profile at "Champions of Essendon"
 Profile at MCG website
 Profile at Sport Australia Hall of Fame

1915 births
2002 deaths
Australian Football Hall of Fame inductees
Brownlow Medal winners
Essendon Football Club players
Essendon Football Club Premiership players
Champions of Essendon
Australian rules footballers from Melbourne
Essendon Football Club coaches
Essendon Football Club Premiership coaches
West Torrens Football Club coaches
Crichton Medal winners
Four-time VFL/AFL Premiership players
Sport Australia Hall of Fame inductees
Four-time VFL/AFL Premiership coaches
People from Essendon, Victoria